Michel’Angelo Grancini (Grancino, born in Milan, 1605; died in Milan, April 17, 1669) was an Italian organist and composer. Grancini composed sacred music. Nineteen volumes were published in Milan (1622–29). Some 200 works are at the Milan Cathedral.

Grancini composed religious music almost exclusively, both in 'stile antico' and 'stile moderno'. His vocal writing reflected the seventeenth century, with Monteverdian derivations. His instrumental music shows the characteristics of the sixteenth-century sonata, joining it to the Gabrieli tradition.

Legacy 
Iesuè wrote (translated from Italian):

Biella (1957), in his Eccellente compositore e organista milanese, praised Grancini as Milan's greatest seventeenth century musician.

Grancini's characteristics are "the clarity and nobility of ideas exposed with a first-rate technique and, as a consequence, a persuasive and interesting logic. He is comparable with his contemporary Giacomo Carissimi. Recitative is always fluid and vibrant, just as alive in the choral episodes and the ensembles he masterfully combines when he uses voices and instruments in counterpoint and fugal interplay of great esteem and beauty."

Grancini died in Milan on 17 April 1669.

Selected works 
 Partitura dell’armonia ecclesiastica de concerti a 1-4 voci, op.1 (1622–1625) 
 Il secondo libro de concerti a 1-4 voci, op 2 (1624–1626) 
 Messe, motetti et canzoni a 8 voci, bc (org), op.4 (1627) 
 Concerti a 1–4 voci, bc (org), amb la Letanie della madonna, libro III, op 5 (1628) 
 Sacri fiori concertati a 1-7 voci con alcuni concerti in sinfonia d'istromenti, op 6 (1631)
 Messa e salmi ariosi con le letanie della Madonna concertati a quattro con la quinta parte a beneplacito, (1632) ampliata con le Antifone della Beata Vergine, op 7 (1637) 
 Il quinto libro de concerti ecclesiastici a 1-4 voci, op 8 (1636)
 Novelli fiori ecclesiastici concertati nell'organo all'uso moderno a 4 voci, op 9 (1643) 
 Musica ecclesiastica da cappella a 4 voci, … aggiuntovi il basso continuo a beneplacito per l'organo, op. 10 (1645) 
 Il primo libro de' madrigali in concerto 2-4 voci, op 11 (1646) 
 Il sesto libro de sacri concerti a 2-4 voci, op.12 (1646) 
 Corona ecclesiastica divisa in due parti a 2-4 voci, op 13 (1649) 
 Il settimo libro de sacri concerti a 2-4 voci, op.14 (1650) 
 Varii concerti a 8 voci, op 15 (1652)
 Giardino spirituale de varii fiori musicali a 4 voci, op 16 (1655) 
 Sacri concerti espressi in 8 messe a 4 voci et un'altra de' morti a 5 secondo il rito ambrosiano, op 17 (1664)
 Sacri concerti espressi in 4 messe a 5 et 6 voci, op 18 (1666)
 Ottavo libro de' concerti ecclesiastici a 2-4 voci con le letanie della B.M.V. a 4 et 3 voci, op 19 (1666)
 Sacri concerti espressi in 8 Magnificat et 8 Pater a 4 voci, secondo il rito ambrosiano, op 20 (1669)
 6 mottetti si trovano in raccolte dell'epoca 
Around 200 manuscripts are conserved at  l'Archivio storico della Fabbrica del duomo di Milano.

References

External links 
 
 

Italian Baroque composers
17th-century Italian composers
1605 births
1669 deaths